Upperville Historic District is a national historic district located at Upperville, Fauquier County, Virginia.  It encompasses 75 contributing buildings in the rural village of Upperville.  The district includes residential, commercial, and institutional buildings that mostly date to the first half of the 19th century.  Notable buildings include the Joseph Carr houses (1796, 1810), the Doctor Smith House (1830s), the United Methodist Church (1833), the Upperville library (1826), and the Baptist Church (1889).

It was listed on the National Register of Historic Places in 1972.

References

Historic districts in Fauquier County, Virginia
Federal architecture in Virginia
Greek Revival architecture in Virginia
National Register of Historic Places in Fauquier County, Virginia
Historic districts on the National Register of Historic Places in Virginia